Enzo Bruno Cesario Farias (born August 30, 1980, in Villa Alemana) is a male professional track and road racing cyclist from Chile. He won two gold medals for his native country at the 2007 Pan American Games in Rio de Janeiro, Brazil.

Career

2000
3rd in Prologue Vuelta Ciclista de Chile, Vitacura (CHI)
3rd in Stage 3 Vuelta Ciclista de Chile, El Tabo (CHI)
1st in Stage 6 Vuelta Ciclista de Chile, Penco (CHI)
2001
  in Pan American Championships, Track, 1 km, Medellin (COL)
2003
2nd in Prologue Vuelta Ciclista de Chile, Concepcion (CHI)
3rd in Stage 8 Vuelta Ciclista de Chile, Limache (CHI)
3rd in Stage 10 Vuelta Ciclista de Chile, Circuito Vitacura (CHI)
  in Pan American Games, Track, Team Pursuit, Santo Domingo (DOM)
2004
  in Pan American Championships, Track, Team Pursuit, San Carlos Tinaquillo
2nd in Stage 2 Vuelta Ciclista de Chile, Chillán (CHI)
1st in Stage 4 part a Vuelta Ciclista de Chile, Curepto (CHI)
2005
2nd in Stage 4 Vuelta Ciclista de Chile, Algarrobo (CHI)
1st in Stage 5 Vuelta Ciclista de Chile, Villa Alemana (CHI)
  in Pan American Championships, Track, Team Pursuit, Mar del Plata (ARG)
alongside Marco Arriagada, Gonzalo Miranda, and Luis Fernando Sepúlveda
  in Pan American Championships, Track, Madison, Mar del Plata (ARG)
1st in Stage 10 Vuelta a Costa Rica, Guapiles (CRC)
2006
3rd in Stage 10 Vuelta Ciclista Lider al Sur, Circuito Santiago (CHI)
2nd in Stage 3 Vuelta Ciclista Por Un Chile Lider, San Esteban (CHI)
2nd in Stage 4 part b Vuelta Ciclista de Chile, Patrimonio de la Humanidad (CHI)
1st in Stage 7 Vuelta Ciclista de Chile, Pichilemu (CHI)
3rd in Stage 8 part b Vuelta Ciclista de Chile, Curicó circuit (CHI)
2nd in Stage 10 Vuelta Ciclista de Chile, Circuito Santiago (CHI)
1st in Sprints and Mountains Classification Vuelta Ciclista de Chile, Circuito Santiago (CHI)
 in Pan American Championships, Track, Team Pursuit, Sao Paulo (BRA)
2007
  in Pan American Games, Track, Individual Pursuit, Rio de Janeiro (BRA)
  in Pan American Games, Track, Team Pursuit, Rio de Janeiro (BRA)
alongside Marco Arriagada, Gonzalo Miranda, and Luis Fernando Sepúlveda

References
 

1980 births
Living people
Chilean male cyclists
Chilean track cyclists
Cyclists at the 1999 Pan American Games
Cyclists at the 2003 Pan American Games
Cyclists at the 2007 Pan American Games
Vuelta Ciclista de Chile stage winners
People from Marga Marga Province
Pan American Games gold medalists for Chile
Pan American Games medalists in cycling
Medalists at the 2003 Pan American Games
Medalists at the 2007 Pan American Games
20th-century Chilean people
21st-century Chilean people